Steven W. Bailey (born July 1, 1971) is an American actor.

Bailey is best known for taking on the character of Steve Williams in the TV show My Big Fat Obnoxious Fiance in 2004, and for playing the recurring character of Joe, a bartender who owns a bar only referred to as "Joe's", on the American television medical drama Grey's Anatomy. He has also had guest spots on Buffy the Vampire Slayer (for 3 episodes in 2002), Angel (in the 2001 episode 'Carpe Noctem'), NCIS, Private Practice, Bunheads and others.  He has also been seen in a number of commercials.

Bailey grew up in Edmonds, Washington and became active in the drama department of Meadowdale High School in Lynnwood, Washington. He graduated from high school in 1989 and trained with the Advanced Training Program at the American Conservatory Theater in San Francisco, California. He returned to the Seattle area and joined the Driftwood Players and Village Theatre while appearing in national commercials and small roles in televised series.

Bailey married Anneliese Boies on June 1, 2002.  The couple divorced in 2012.

References

External links 

American male television actors
Male actors from San Diego
1971 births
Living people
American Conservatory Theater alumni
People from Edmonds, Washington
People from Lynnwood, Washington
21st-century American male actors